The Notice of the Day is a 2001  Argentine comedy-drama film directed and written by María Victoria Menis with Diana Iceruk. The film, which premiered on 2 August 2001 in Buenos Aires, stars Enrique Pinti and Carmen Maura. Maura was nominated for a Silver Condor Award for Best Actress in 2002 for her role in the film.

Cast
Enrique Pinti ....  Leopoldo Arregui
Carmen Maura ....  Isabel
Damián Dreyzik ....  Gabi (as Damián Dreizik)
Lucrecia Capello ....  Silvia
Daniel Casablanca ....  Beto Arregui
Alicia Mouxaut ....  Perla
Vanessa Weinberg ....  Marta Arregui (as Vanesa Weinberg)
Alicia Zanca ....  Nurse
Jorge Suárez ....  Dr. Inchausti
Claudia Lapacó ....  Chantal
Alberto Anchart
Lisette García Orsu ....  Salomé
Marcelo Xicarte ....  Ramírez
Luis Ziembrowsky ....  Médico (as Luis Ziembrowski)
Silvina Bosco ....  Norma

External links
 

2001 films
2000s Spanish-language films
2001 comedy-drama films
Argentine comedy-drama films
2000s Argentine films